Alberto Queiros (born April 28, 1978) is a  footballer, currently playing for Vendée Fontenay Foot as a midfielder.

External links
Alberto Queiros profile at chamoisfc79.fr

1978 births
Living people
People from Niort
French footballers
Association football midfielders
Chamois Niortais F.C. players
Stade Lavallois players
US Créteil-Lusitanos players
Ligue 2 players
Vendée Fontenay Foot players
Association football defenders
Sportspeople from Deux-Sèvres
Footballers from Nouvelle-Aquitaine